Diego Alejandro Franco Mares (born September 13, 1992, in Mexico City) is a Mexican professional footballer who plays for Stellenbosch in the 
South African Premier Division.

External links
 
 
 

1992 births
Living people
Footballers from Mexico City
Mexican footballers
Mexican expatriate footballers
Atlético San Luis footballers
C.D. Tepatitlán de Morelos players
University of Pretoria F.C. players
Liga MX players
Ascenso MX players
Liga FPD players
National First Division players
South African Premier Division players
Association football midfielders
Mexican expatriate sportspeople in Costa Rica
Mexican expatriate sportspeople in Spain
Expatriate footballers in Costa Rica
Expatriate footballers in Spain
Expatriate soccer players in South Africa